Sauron is a genus of sheet weavers that was first described by K. Y. Eskov & Y. M. Marusik in 1995. The genus name is derived from Sauron, a character in the books of J. R. R. Tolkien.

Species
 it contains only two species, S. fissocornis and S. rayi. S. fissocornis was described from individuals collected in the Saur Mountains of Kazakhstan. S. rayi was originally described by Eugène Simon in 1881 as Erigone rayi, and occurs throughout Central and Eastern Europe from France to Russia.

See also
 List of Linyphiidae species (Q–Z)

References

Araneomorphae genera
Linyphiidae
Spiders of Europe
Spiders of Asia
Organisms named after Tolkien and his works